La troupe du Roi de Danemark, or Roi de Danemark for short, was a French-speaking Danish court theatre, active at the Royal Danish court from 1682 until 1721. It was the only permanent theater in Denmark during its tenure.

The first French theater troupe had performed at the royal Danish court under Jean Guilmois de Rosidor (father of Claude Guilmois de Rosidor) in 1669–70, but that was but a temporary visit. The Roi de Danemark was engaged 23 March 1682. It was composed of French artists, who performed French language plays exclusively for the royal Danish court on temporary stages arranged at the various royal palaces. The composition of the troupe varied, but normally consisted of circa twelve people. It was the only permanent theatre company in Denmark during its tenure, when the only other theater activity in Copenhagen consisted of temporary visits from travelling foreign theater company's.

In 1721, the French court theater was dissolved by the monarch, who preferred German opera. Some of the members of the former court theater, who had lived in Denmark for most of their lives and in some cases even been born there, did not wish to leave Denmark, and therefore founded the first permanent public theater in Copenhagen, Lille Grønnegade Theatre, in January 1722.

Members
 Paul Belleville de Foy
 Claude Biet dit Hauteville
 Nicolas Bonneville
 Madame Bonneville
 Jean Bouillart dit La Garde, 1682–94
 Julien Bourdais dit Dorilly, 1686–94
 Mlle Jeanne Chambly, 1701 to 1717
 Mlle Rosette
 Marie-Madeleine-Armande de la Garde 1682-90
 Philippe Chaumont
 Mlle Marie-Madeleine-Ange Coirat dite Mlle de Belleroche, 1682–89
 M. Ange-François Corrare / Coirat dit Belleroche, 1682–95
 Charles Chevillet dit Champmeslé, 1682–85
 Nicolas Desmares, 
 Jacques Du Buisson, 1701–21
 Nicolas Du Majot (ou Du Manjot), 1701–08
 Anne d'Ennebaut, 1682
 d'Erval
 Mlle Martine-Geneviève Giraut, 1694
 Laurent Guérin d'Estriché
 Jubert
 Jeanne-Françoise de Lan Bellefleur, 1692
 Marthe Le Charton, 1682
 Mlle Claude Loier, ép. Du Buisson, 1701
 Jean-Baptiste de Lorme dit Châteauvert, 1686
 Marie Madeleine de Montaigu, 1716-1721
 René Magnon dit Montaigu, 1686-1721
 Nicolas-Jean-Baptiste Morin dit de La Croix
 Jean de Nevers, 1682–94
 Jean de Nouvel, 1682
 Charles-Louis Pallai dit Versigny, 1682
 Françoise de Penhoet Nevers, 1682-1690
 Louis Perlis, 1704-1721
 Jean Poisson dit Poisson de Granville, 1706-1710
 Toinette Poitiers Hauteville, 1701-1704
 Mlle Rochemore, 1686
 Roudo, 1702
 François Toubel, 1703-1705
 Marie-Anne de Touchemarie Poisson de Granville, 1706-1710
 Verstang, 1686

See also
 La troupe du Roi de Suede

References
 Dansk kvindebiografisk leksikon
 
 Frederick J. Marker,Lise-Lone Marke: A History of Scandinavian Theatre
 Nystrøm, E Den Danske Komedies Oprindelse 1918
 Gyldendal. Den Store Danske

17th century in Denmark
17th-century theatre
18th century in Denmark
18th-century theatre
French comedy troupes
Danish comedy troupes
1682 establishments in Denmark
1721 disestablishments
Theatre companies in Denmark